One Warm Word is a 2013 South Korean television series starring Han Hye-jin, Ji Jin-hee, Kim Ji-soo, and Lee Sang-woo. It aired on SBS from 2 December 2013 to 24 February 2014 on Mondays and Tuesdays at 21:55 for 20 episodes.

Plot
The drama explores the reality and complexities of married life. Eun-jin and Jae-hak, who are married to other people, find themselves attracted to each other. Their marriages become in danger of unraveling, as their affair disrupts the lives of family and friends around them.

Cast

Main characters
Han Hye-jin as Na Eun-jin
Ji Jin-hee as Yoo Jae-hak
Kim Ji-soo as Song Mi-kyung
Lee Sang-woo as Kim Sung-soo

Supporting characters
 Eun-jin and Sung-soo's family
Yoon Joo-sang as Na Dae-ho, Eun-jin's father
Go Doo-shim as Kim Na-ra, Eun-jin's mother
Yoon Jong-hwa as Na Jin-chul, Eun-jin's younger brother
Yoon Joo-hee as Yoon Sun-ah, Jin-chul's wife
Han Groo as Na Eun-young, Eun-jin's younger sister 
Lee Chae-mi as Kim Yoon-jung, Sung-soo and Eun-jin's daughter
Yang Ohn-yoo as Na Hoon, Jin-chul and Sun-ah's son

 Jae-hak and Mi-kyung's family
Park Jung-soo as Mrs. Choo, Jae-hak's mother
Park Seo-joon as Song Min-soo, Mi-kyung's half brother 
Kim Dae-sung as Yoo Hye-hwang, Jae-hak and Mi-kyung's eldest son
Jeon Jin-seo as Yoo Hye-joon, Jae-hak and Mi-kyung's second son

 Extended cast
Choi Hwa-jung as Choi Anna, cooking class instructor
Son Hwa-ryung as Ji-hye, cooking class student/Eun-jin's friend
Kim Hye-na as Young-kyung, cooking class student/Eun-jin's senior

Ratings
In the table below, the blue numbers represent the lowest ratings and the red numbers represent the highest ratings.

Awards and nominations

References

External links
One Warm Word official SBS website 

2013 South Korean television series debuts
2014 South Korean television series endings
Seoul Broadcasting System television dramas
Korean-language television shows
South Korean romance television series
Television series by HB Entertainment